This is a list of Christian metal artists, including artists that played Christian metal at some point in their careers.

Christian metal, which is also known as white metal or heavenly metal, is heavy metal music with a Christian message. Christian metal is regarded more of a concept rather than a genre since it has no specific musical characteristics. It emerged in the late 1970s as a means of evangelization to the wider heavy metal music scene and was pioneered by American bands Resurrection Band and Barnabas, Swedish bands Jerusalem and Narnia, Canadian band Daniel Band. Christian metal bands a lot of people don’t know are Christian are such as Skillet or Flyleaf. Los Angeles' Stryper achieved wide success in the 1980s. In the mid to late 1980s, extreme metal genres were popularized by bands such as Vengeance Rising, Deliverance, Believer and Tourniquet. In the early 1990, the Australian death metal band Mortification rose to prominence within its country's underground metal scene. At the turn of the 21st century, P.O.D., with two platinum-selling albums, achieved a mainstream commercial success rivaling that of Stryper. The metalcore groups Underoath, Demon Hunter, As I Lay Dying and Norma Jean (dubbed by the magazine Revolver as "The Holy Alliance") also brought some mainstream attention to the movement in the first decade of the 2000s, achieving ranks in the Billboard 200.

0-9

2Tm2,3
3rd Root
7 Angels 7 Plagues
7 Horns 7 Eyes
12 Stones
38th Parallel

A

Abated Mass of Flesh
Ace Augustine
Admonish
Advent
Aggelos
The Agony Scene
Aletheian
Alisa
Alove for Enemies
Altars
Altera Enigma
Antestor
Antidemon
Argyle Park
Ark of the Covenant
Armageddon Holocaust
Arvinger
As Cities Burn
As Hell Retreats
As I Lay Dying
As They Sleep
The Ascendicate
Ascending King
Ashen Mortality
At the Throne of Judgment
Atomic Opera
Attack Attack!
Audiovision
August Burns Red
The Autumn League

B

Balance of Power
Barnabas
Barren Cross
The Beckoning
Becoming Saints
Becoming the Archetype
Before Their Eyes
Behold the Kingdom
Being as an Ocean
Believer
Beloved
Benea Reach
Besieged
Betraying the Martyrs
Blessed by a Broken Heart
Blessthefall
Blindside
Blood Covenant
Blood of the Martyrs
Bloodgood
Bloodlined Calligraphy
Bloodline Severed
Cesare Bonizzi
Bride
Broken Flesh
Brotality
A Bullet for Pretty Boy
Burden of a Day
The Burial
Burn It Down

C

Cage
Called to Arms
Call to Preserve
Callisto
The Chariot
Chasing Victory
Chatterbox
Children of Wrath
Christageddon
Church Tongue
Circle of Dust
Clear Convictions
Close Your Eyes
The Color Morale
Colossus
Conditions
Confide
Conveyer
Convictions
Corpus Christi
Creations
Cries Hannah
The Crimson Armada
Crimson Moonlight
Crimson Thorn
The Crucified
Cruentis
Cry of the Afflicted

D

Daniel Band
Darkness Divided
Darkwater
Day of Vengeance
Death Requisite
Death Therapy
Debtor
Deliverance
Demise of Eros
Demon Hunter
Demoniciduth
Destroy the Runner
Detritus
Deus Invictus
Deuteronomium
The Devil Wears Prada
Die Happy
DigHayZoose
Dire
Disciple
Divide the Sea
Divinefire
Dizmas
Doomsday Hymn
Drottnar

E

Earth Groans
East West
Echo Hollow
Elgibbor
Embodiment 12:14
Embodyment
Emery
Eso-Charis
Eternal Decision
Evelynn
Everdown
Every Day Life
Every Knee Shall Bow
Everyone Dies in Utah
Everything in Slow Motion
Extol

F

Falling Cycle
Falling Up
Fallstar
Family Force 5
The Famine
Fasedown
Feast Eternal
A Feast for Kings
Few Left Standing
Figure Four
Final Surrender
Fit for a King
Flawed by Design
Fleshkiller
Flyleaf
Focused
For All Eternity
For Today
For the Fallen Dreams
Foreknown
Forevermore
Forfeit Thee Untrue
From the Shallows
Frosthardr
Frost Like Ashes

G

Galactic Cowboys
The Gates of Slumber
The Gentleman Homicide
Gideon
Glass Casket
Gnashing of Teeth
Golden Resurrection
Grave Declaration
Grave Forsaken
The Great Commission
Gretchen
Guardian
Gwen Stacy

H

Hand of Fire
Hands
The Handshake Murders
Harmony
Haste the Day
HB
He Is Legend
Heaven's Force
Here I Come Falling
A Hill to Die Upon
Holy Blood
Holy Soldier
Hope for the Dying
Hopesfall
Horde
Hortor
Hundredth

I

I, the Breather
I Am Terrified
Immortal Souls
Impellitteri
Impending Doom
Indwelling
Inevitable End
Inhale Exhale
Inked in Blood
In the Midst of Lions
Islander

J

Jacobs Dream
Jamie's Elsewhere
Jerusalem
Jesus Wept
Jonah33
Joshua
Justifide

K

Kekal
King James
Kingston Falls
Kohllapse
Kryst the Conqueror
Kutless

L

Lament
Leaders
Christopher Lee
Lengsel
The Letter Black
Letter to the Exiles
Leviticus
Life in Your Way
Light Unseen 
Living Sacrifice
Love and Death
Lucerin Blue
Lust Control
Luti-Kriss
LVL

M

Mad Max
Magdallan
Manafest
Mantric
Maranatha
Mastedon
Mayfly
Maylene and the Sons of Disaster
Means
Mehida
Memphis May Fire
Messiah Prophet
Messengers
Metanoia
Mindrage
Miseration
Misery Chastain
Monotheist
Mortal
Morphia
Mortal Treason
Mortification
Mouth of the South
My Heart to Fear
My Ransomed Soul
MyChildren MyBride

N

Nailed Promise
Narcissus
Narnia
Necromance
Neon Cross
Nine Lashes
No Innocent Victim
Nodes of Ranvier
Norma Jean
Nothing Left
Nothing Til Blood
Nuclear Blaze

O

O, Majestic Winter
Officer Negative
Oficina G3
Oh, Sleeper
Oil
Once Dead
Once Nothing
One Bad Pig
Onward to Olympas
The Ongoing Concept
Opprobrium
Outrage A.D.
Overcome
The Overseer

P

Pantokrator
Paradox
Paramaecium
A Past Unknown
PAX217
Peace of Mind
Petra
Philadelphia
Phinehas
Pillar
Place of Skulls
A Plea for Purging
P.O.D.
Point of Recognition
Poured Out
Precious Death
Project 86
Promise Land
Pyramaze

R

R.A.I.D.
Raid
Random Hero
Recon
Red
Reform the Resistance
ReinXeed
Remembrance
Remove the Veil
Renascent
Resurrection Band
Revulsed
Righteous Vendetta 
Rival Choir
Rob Rock
Rod Laver
Randy Rose

S

Sacrament
Sacred Warrior
The Sacrificed
Sacrificium
Saint
Sanctifica
Saving Grace
Saviour Machine
Scarlet
Schaliach
Scourged Flesh
Seasons in the Field
See the Rise
Seemless
Selfmindead
Separatist
Serianna
Settle the Sky
Seventh Angel
Seventh Avenue
Seventh Day Slumber
Seventh Star
Sever Your Ties
Shadows of Paragon
Shai Hulud
Shout
Showbread
The Showdown
Signum Regis
Silent Planet
Sinai Beach
Sinbreed
Since October
SinDizzy
Six Feet Deep
Skald in Veum
Skillet
Slechtvalk
Sleeping by the Riverside
Sleeping Giant
Society's Finest
Solamors 
Solus Deus
Soul Embraced
Sovereign Strength
Spirit and the Bride
Spitfire
Spoken
Stars Are Falling
Stavesacre
Still Breathing
Still Remains
Strengthen What Remains
Stretch Arm Strong
Strongarm
Stryken
Stryper
Sympathy
Symphony in Peril
Symphony of Heaven

T

Taking the Head of Goliath
Tantrum of the Muse
Tempest
Temple of Blood
Temple of Perdition
Texas In July
Theocracy
Thieves & Liars
This Is Hell
This or the Apocalypse
Those Who Fear
Thousand Foot Krutch
A Thousand Times Repent
Through Solace
Timōrātus
To Speak of Wolves
Toarn
Tortured Conscience
Tourniquet
Training for Utopia
Travail
Trenches
Trouble
Trytan
The Tug Fork River Band
Twelve Gauge Valentine

U

Ultimatum
Unashamed
Undercover
Underneath the Gun
Undish
UnTeachers

V

V8
Vaakevandring
Vardøger
Vengeance Rising
Venia
Veni Domine
Vials of Wrath
Virgin Black
Vomitorial Corpulence

W

Wage War
War of Ages
Warlord
We as Human
We the Gathered
Brian Welch
What We Do in Secret
Whitecross
With Blood Comes Cleansing
Woe of Tyrants
Wolves at the Gate
Worldview
Wovenwar
Wrench in the Works
Wytch Hazel

X

X-Sinner
xDeathstarx
xDisciplex A.D.
XIII Minutes
XT
XXI

Y

Your Chance to Die 
Your Memorial

Z
Zao

See also

Christian metal
Unblack metal
List of Christian hardcore bands
List of Christian punk bands
List of Christian rock bands
List of heavy metal bands

Notes

References

Bibliography

 
Christian metal
Metal artists
Metal